Matti Niemi may refer to:

Matti Niemi (hurdler) (born 1976), Finnish hurdler
Matti Niemi (rowing) (born 1937), Finnish coxswain